David Ian Berguer (born October 1939) is a British local historian and author, and the chairman of the Friern Barnet and District Local History Society. His books include The Friern Hospital Story (2012), the story of the former Colney Hatch Asylum.

Writing

His career was in media management in the advertising industry. He retired in 2000 and at that time was one of the founders of the Friern Barnet and District Local History Society. His first book was Under the Wires at Tally Ho, an examination of the trams and trolleybuses that once served the area of Finchley in north London.

This was followed by The Friern Hospital Story, which examined the complete history of the former Colney Hatch Asylum, later known as Friern Hospital, from its design and opening in 1851 to its closure in 1993, and subsequent conversion to flats known as Princess Park Manor. In 2014 the book was named by the London & Middlesex Archaeological Society the best single topic publication written by a member of their 55 affiliated local history societies.

In 2014, Berguer produced All over by Christmas, an examination of conditions on the home front in Barnet during the First World War for which he and a team trawled local newspapers from the wartime period to extract the source material. He originally thought the book would be short but there was so much information available that the final work was nearly 300 pages long. In 2016, he produced Whetstone Revealed with John Heathfield.

Selected publications
Under the Wires at Tally Ho: Trams and Trolleybuses of North London, 1905-1962. The History Press, Stroud, 2011. 
The Friern Hospital Story. Chaville Press, London, 2012. 
All over by Christmas. Chaville Press, London, 2014. 
Whetstone Revealed. Chaville Press, London, 2016. (With John Heathfield)

See also
The Tally Ho, Finchley

References 

Living people
1939 births
Historians of Middlesex
Finchley
Friern Barnet
Whetstone, London